In functional analysis and related areas of mathematics a FK-space or Fréchet coordinate space is a sequence space equipped with a topological structure such that it becomes a Fréchet space. FK-spaces with a normable topology are called BK-spaces.

There exists only one topology to turn a sequence space into a Fréchet space, namely the topology of pointwise convergence. Thus the name coordinate space because a sequence in an FK-space converges if and only if it converges for each coordinate.

FK-spaces are examples of topological vector spaces. They are important in summability theory.

Definition

A FK-space is a sequence space , that is a linear subspace of vector space of all complex valued sequences, equipped with the topology of pointwise convergence.

Then sequence  in  converges to some point  if it converges pointwise for each  That is

if for all

Examples

The sequence space  of all complex valued sequences is trivially an FK-space.

Properties

is a continuous function.

FK-space constructions

Given a countable family of FK-spaces  with  a countable family of seminorms, we define

and

Then  is again an FK-space.

See also

  − FK-spaces with a normable topology

References

F-spaces
Fréchet spaces
Topological vector spaces